Mesoniscus is a genus of woodlice, placed in its own family, Mesoniscidae, and section, Microcheta. It contains two species – Mesoniscus alpicolus and Mesoniscus graniger – that live in Central and Eastern Europe, mostly in and around caves.

Distribution

Mesoniscus is restricted to Central Europe and the Balkan Peninsula; the ranges of its two species do not overlap.

M. alpicolus is found in Lombardy and the Northern Calcareous Alps.

M. graniger has a wider distribution than its congener; it is found in much of the Carpathians, including the Bihor and Banat mountains, and in the Dinaric Alps and Julian Alps. It is also found in the Caves of Aggtelek Karst in Hungary.

Taxonomy
The first description of a woodlouse now in the genus Mesoniscus was in 1858, when Camill Heller described "Titanethes alpicolus" in 1858. This was followed in 1865 by the description by János Frivaldszky (Ján Frivaldský) of the subspecies "Titanethes alpicolus graniger".

Mesoniscus is the only genus in the family Mesoniscidae, and is considered so distinct from other woodlice that the family is placed in a separate section, named Microcheta.

Ecology
Mesoniscus species lack the pleopodal lungs found in many other woodlice, and are restricted to damp environments.

References

External links

Woodlice
Crustacean genera
Cave crustaceans
Woodlice of Europe